Harpalus marginellus is a species of ground beetle that can be found in such countries as Austria, Bulgaria, Czech Republic, Germany, Hungary, Italy, Poland, Slovakia, Switzerland, all states of former Yugoslavia (except for North Macedonia), and southern part of Russia.

References

marginellus
Beetles of Europe
Beetles described in 1829